Football Championship of the Uzbekistan SSR (Uzbek: Футбол бўйича Ўзбекистон ССР чемпионати; Russian: Чемпионат Узбекской ССР по футболу) — football tournament, reveals the strongest amateur football team of the Uzbekistan SSR which was part of the Soviet Union (USSR). Was played from 1926 to 1991. In the football league system of the USSR had the status of competition of collectives of physical culture.

History
From 1926 to 1936 was carried out as the «Championship of the cities of Uzbekistan SSR», and only in 1937 as the «Championship of the Uzbek SSR».

The most powerful football clubs, as well as semi-professional and professional clubs of the Uzbekistan SSR participated in the Championships of the USSR (Higher League, First League, Second League and Second League B).

The winners of the Uzbekistan SSR Championship was qualified in the Second League B, and the team took the last place was eliminated in the regional, district or city Championships of the Uzbekistan SSR.

The successor of the Uzbekistan SSR Championship is the Championship of Uzbekistan, which has been conducted since 1992, after the independence of Uzbekistan.

Champions

Championship of the cities of Uzbekistan SSR 
Uzbek: Өzbəkiston SSR şaharlari çempionatiRussian: Чемпионат городов Узбекской ССР

Uzbekistan SSR Championship 
Uzbek: Ўзбекистон ССР чемпионатиRussian: Чемпионат Узбекской ССР

References

External links
 

Football leagues in Uzbekistan
Uzbekistan SSR
Uzbek Soviet Socialist Republic
Defunct second level football leagues in Europe
Defunct third level football leagues in Europe
Sports leagues established in 1926
Sports leagues established in 1937
Sports leagues disestablished in 1991
1926 establishments in the Soviet Union
1937 establishments in the Soviet Union
1991 disestablishments in the Soviet Union